The 1932 municipal election was held November 9, 1932 to elect a mayor and five aldermen to sit on Edmonton City Council and three trustees to sit on the public school board, while three trustees were acclaimed to the separate school board.

There were ten aldermen on city council, but five of the positions were already filled: Rice Sheppard (SS), Harry Ainlay (SS), James Findlay, Herbert Baker, and Arthur Gainer were all elected to two-year terms in 1931 and were still in office.

There were seven trustees on the public school board, but four of the positions were already filled:   Albert Ottewell (SS), Frank Crang (SS), L. Y. Cairns, and Arthur Cushing had all been elected to two-year terms in 1931 and were still in office.  The same was true of the separate school board, where Charles Gariepy, T Malone, Thomas Magee, and J Tansey (SS) were continuing.

Voter turnout

There were 22,538 ballots cast out of 43,523 eligible voters, for a voter turnout of 51.7%.

Results

 bold or  indicates elected
 italics indicate incumbent
 "SS", where data is available, indicates representative for Edmonton's South Side, with a minimum South Side representation instituted after the city of Strathcona, south of the North Saskatchewan River, amalgamated into Edmonton on February 1, 1912.

Mayor

Aldermen

Public school trustees

Separate (Catholic) school trustees

Adrien Crowe (SS), J O Pilon, and W D Trainor were acclaimed.

References

Election History, City of Edmonton: Elections and Census Office

1932
1932 elections in Canada
1932 in Alberta